Rubus depavitus is a North American species of dewberry, known as the Aberdeen dewberry. Like other dewberries, it is a species of flowering plant in the rose family, related to the blackberry. It is native to the east-central United States (Indiana, Kentucky, Maryland, North Carolina, New Jersey, Ohio, and West Virginia).

References

depravitus
Flora of the Eastern United States
Plants described in 1943
Taxa named by Liberty Hyde Bailey